Ioana Mihalache (born December 28, 1990) is a Romanian actress, model,  beauty pageant titleholder, and an economist, who was crowned as Miss Universe Romania 2017. She represented Romania at the Miss Universe 2017 pageant.

Personal life
Mihalache was born in Constanța, Romania.

Education 
Mihalache graduated from Ovidius University in Constanţa with a degree in economics and a master's degree in European Regional Development Policies. In addition to her native Romanian, Mihalache speaks three other languages: English, Spanish and Italian.

Career 
Mihalache's modeling career started at 15.
As an international model, Mihalache has participated in fashion shows in, among other countries, the United States, Great Britain, Italy, Turkey, Lebanon, China, and the United Arab Emirates.

Pageantry

Miss Universe Romania 2012
Mihalache was declared third runner-up at Miss Universe Romania 2012.

Miss World Romania 2013
Mihalache was also declared first runner up at the Miss World Romania 2013. and went on to represent Romania in Miss Earth 2013 in the Philippines.

Miss Earth 2013
Mihalache represented Romania at the Miss Earth 2013 in the Philippines but unplaced.

Miss Grand International 2016
Mihalache also represented Romania at the Miss Grand International 2016 but unplaced.

Miss Universe Romania 2017 
Mihalache was crowned as Miss Universe Romania 2017 after defeating 23 other contestants competing for the title and would go on to represent Romania in the Miss Universe 2017 international pageant held in Las Vegas.

Miss Universe 2017 
Mihalache represented Romania at the Miss Universe 2017 in Las Vegas but unplaced.

References

1990 births
Living people
Miss Universe 2017 contestants
Romanian female models
Romanian beauty pageant winners
Romanian actresses
Miss Earth 2013 contestants